This list of awards for actresses is an index to articles to describe awards given to actresses. It excludes film awards for lead actress and television awards for Best Actress, which are covered by separate lists.

General

Debut actress

Best supporting actress (television)

See also

 Lists of awards
 Lists of acting awards
 List of film awards for lead actress 
 List of television awards for Best Actress

References

 
Actresses
Film awards for debut actress